Mangelia sicula, common name the Sicilian mangelia, is a species of sea snail, a marine gastropod mollusk in the family Mangeliidae.

Description
The length of the shell attains 12 mm.

(Original description) The shell is somewhat fusiform. The spire is acuminated. The whorls are rounded, rather gibbous, concentrically ribbed, smooth. The aperture is short and ovate. The sinus is rather conspicuous. The color of the shell is dark chesnut-brown within and without. The lip is yellowish, crossed with fine brown lines.

The color of the shell is chestnut- or chocolate-brown within and without, with narrow brown lines, more conspicuous on the thickened lip, which is lighter colored. The whorls are rounded, rather gibbous, those of the spire obtusely angulated.

Distribution
This marine species occurs in the Mediterranean Sea off Cyprus and Italy; in the Atlantic Ocean off Madeira.

References

External links
 
  Tucker, J.K. 2004 Catalog of recent and fossil turrids (Mollusca: Gastropoda). Zootaxa 682:1–1295.

sicula
Gastropods described in 1846